A by-election was held for the Australian House of Representatives seat of Higgins on 24 February 1968. It was triggered by the presumed drowning death of the Prime Minister and Liberal Party MP Harold Holt on 17 December 1967.

Background
On 15 January 1968, the speaker William Ashton stated that there was conclusive evidence that Holt had died, and that a writ would be issued for the by-election. Senator John Gorton, who had been elected party leader and Prime Minister by his party colleagues on 9 January, was preselected unopposed to run for the Liberal Party on 31 January. The Australian Labor Party nominated David Bennett, a research officer with the Australian Council for Educational Research, whilst the Democratic Labor Party, who had received 11.56% of the vote at the November 1966 election in the seat, opted not to contest the election. The other two candidates were Dr Leonard Webber for the Australia Reform Movement, and a Sydney journalist, Frank Courtis.

Gorton won the by-election for the Liberals with an increased primary vote.

It remains the only time in which a sitting Prime Minister was a candidate in a by-election.

Results

See also
 1968 Liberal Party of Australia leadership election
 List of Australian federal by-elections

References

1968 elections in Australia
Victorian federal by-elections
1960s in Victoria (Australia)
February 1968 events in Australia